The Ligue Francophone de Football Americain de Belgique (LFFAB) is one of the two conferences of the Belgian Football League (BFL). It consists of teams from the French Community, whereas the Flemish American Football League (FFL) consists of teams from the Flemish Community. The top three teams from the Francophone League qualify for the BFL playoffs at the conclusion of the regular season. The playoffs determine which teams play in the Belgian Bowl.

Teams
There are 8 LFFAB teams. The Wolves are currently on hold.

 On hold*

Season's History
W = Wins, L = Losses, T = Ties, PCT = Winning Percentage, PF= Points For, PA = Points Against 
 - clinched seed to the playoffs

2005 season

2005 Playoffs

2006 season

2006 Playoffs

2007 season

2007 Playoffs

2008 season

2008 Playoffs

2009 season

2009 Playoffs

2010 season

2010 Playoffs

2011 season

2011 Playoffs

2012 season

2012 Playoffs

2013 season

2013 Playoffs

2014 season

2014 Playoffs

References

External links
Official LFFAB website
Official BFL website
Official FFL website

American football in Belgium
2003 establishments in Belgium
Sports leagues established in 2003
American football leagues in Europe